Susan E Williams (born 18 March 1952) is a British former international swimmer.

Swimming career
She competed in four events at the 1968 Summer Olympics.

She represented England in the freestyle and medley events, at the 1966 British Empire and Commonwealth Games in Kingston, Jamaica. Four years later she represented England in the butterfly and freestyle events, at the 1970 British Commonwealth Games in Edinburgh, Scotland.

She won the 1967 ASA National British Championships over 200 metres freestyle, was the 400 metres freestyle champion in 1967 and 1969 and won the 800 metres freestyle in 1967 and 1969. She also won the 440 yards medley in 1966.

References

1952 births
Living people
British female swimmers
Olympic swimmers of Great Britain
Swimmers at the 1968 Summer Olympics
Sportspeople from Exeter
Swimmers at the 1966 British Empire and Commonwealth Games
Swimmers at the 1970 British Commonwealth Games
Commonwealth Games competitors for England